Eocryphops is an extinct genus of trilobite in the family Phacopidae. There are at least three described species in Eocryphops.

Species
These three species belong to the genus Eocryphops:
 † Eocryphops albertii Holloway, 2005
 † Eocryphops kayseri
 † Eocryphops termieri

References

Phacopidae
Articles created by Qbugbot